Lehlohonolo Benedict Ledwaba (27 July 1971 – 2 July 2021) was a South African professional boxer who competed from 1990 to 2006, and held the IBF super bantamweight title from 1999 to 2001.

Ledwaba died from COVID-19 on 2 July 2021, at age 49.

Professional career
Ledwaba turned pro in 1990 and in 1999 captured the vacant IBF super bantamweight title with a decision victory over John Michael Johnson.  Ledwaba defended the belt 5 times before losing it to Manny Pacquiao via TKO to earn Pacquiao his second world championship in two weight divisions. Ledwaba continued to fight, but has never challenged for a major title since the loss. He retired from boxing after his loss to Maxwell Awuku on 24 November 2006.

Professional boxing record

References

External links

1971 births
2021 deaths
Bantamweight boxers
International Boxing Federation champions
Sportspeople from Soweto
South African male boxers
Super-bantamweight boxers
Featherweight boxers
Super-featherweight boxers
World super-bantamweight boxing champions
Deaths from the COVID-19 pandemic in South Africa